The women's 4 × 400 metres relay at the 2022 European Athletics Championships will take place at the Olympiastadion on 19 and 20 August.

Records

Schedule

Results

Round 1
First 3 in each heat (Q) and 2 best performers (q) advance to the Final.

Final

References

4 x 400 metres relay W
Relays at the European Athletics Championships
Euro